Arsène Pint (born 7 May 1933) is a Belgian modern pentathlete. He competed at the 1960 Summer Olympics.

References

External links
 

1933 births
Living people
Belgian male modern pentathletes
Olympic modern pentathletes of Belgium
Modern pentathletes at the 1960 Summer Olympics
People from Halle, Belgium
Sportspeople from Flemish Brabant